New Waters is a Finnish experimental hardcore band, where they primarily play hardcore, crossover thrash, and thrashcore styles of music. They come from Jyväskylä, Finland. The band started making music in 2010. The band released an extended play, Lions, in 2013, with Blood and Ink Records. Their subsequent release, a studio album, Venture, was released in 2014, by Authentic Sounds.

Background
New Waters is an experimental hardcore band from Jyväskylä, Finland. Their members are Miika, Oula, Pete, Ville, and Henri.

Music history
The band commenced as a musical entity in February 2010, with their first release, Lions, an extended play, that was released on 12 February 2013, from Blood and Ink Records. Their subsequent release, a studio album, Venture, was released on 10 December 2014, with Authentic Sounds.

Members
Current members
 Miika Luoma
 Oula Maaranen
 Pete Huttunen
 Ville Saarni
 Henri Lahtinen

Discography
Studio albums
 Venture (10 December 2014, Authentic Sounds)
 Experience (4 April 2018, not on label)
EPs
 Lions (12 February 2013, Blood and Ink)

References

External links
 Facebook page
 Blood and Ink Records

Finnish hardcore punk groups
2010 establishments in Finland
Musical groups established in 2010
Blood and Ink Records artists